The 2004 AFC Cup was the first edition of the AFC Cup, playing between clubs from nations who are members of the Asian Football Confederation.

Qualification
The 'developing' 14 nations in the Asian Football Confederation were invited to nominate one or two clubs to participate in the 2004 competition.

Group stage
Key to colors in group tables:
Green: Group winners and best runners-up advance to the quarter finals.

Group A

1Al Sha'ab Ibb were awarded a 3–0 win as Muktijoddha Sangsad KS did not show up for the match.
2The match was cancelled after a general strike in Yemen left Al Sha'ab Ibb unable to show up for the match.

Group B

Group C

Group D

Group E

Best runners-up
Three  best runners-up, one from groups A, B and C and two from groups D and E, qualify for the quarter finals.

Group A, B, C (West & Central Asia Zone)

Group D, E (East, South & South East Asia Zone)

Knockout stage

 Bracket

Quarter-finals

|}

1 Al-Wahda (Damascus) (Syria) won on away goals.

First leg

Second leg

Semifinals

|}

First leg

Second leg

Finals

|}

 Al-Jaish (Damascus) (Syria) won on away goals rule.

First leg

Second leg

Statistics

Top goalscorers

See also

AFC Champions League 2004

References

External links
Official site
AFC Calendar of Events 2007

2004 in Asian football
AFC Cup seasons